Headspace gas chromatography uses headspace gas—from the top or "head" of a sealed container containing a liquid or solid brought to equilibrium—injected directly onto a gas chromatographic column for separation and analysis. In this process, only the most volatile (most readily existing as a vapor) substances make it to the column. The technique is commonly applied to the analysis of polymers, food and beverages, blood alcohol levels, environmental variables, cosmetics, and pharmaceutical ingredients.

Introduction
Chemists often use the phrase "standard temperature and pressure" or "STP" to convey that they are working at a temperature of 0 °C and one atmosphere of pressure (International Union of Pure and Applied Chemistry). There are three states of matter under these conditions: solids, liquids, and gases. Although all three are distinct states, both solids and gases can dissolve (or disperse) in liquids. The most commonly occurring liquid in the biosphere is water. All components of the atmosphere are capable of dissolving in water to some degree. The bulk of the stable natural components of the atmosphere are nitrogen, oxygen, carbon dioxide, gaseous water, argon, and other trace gases.  
	
Materials that exist primarily in the gas phase at STP (i.e., "evaporates more than 95% by weight within six months under ambient evaporation testing conditions") are referred to as "volatile." Many natural and man-made (anthropogenic) materials are stable in two states at STP, earning them the title "semivolatile." A naturally occurring volatile that is sometimes found in aqueous solution is methane; water itself is semivolatile. Man-made or anthropogenic chemicals also occur in these classes. Examples of volatile anthropogenic chemicals include the refrigerants chlorofluorocarbons (CFCs) and hydrofluorocarbons (HCFCs). Semivolatile anthropogenics can exist as mixtures, such as petroleum distillates or as pure chemicals like trichloroethylene (TCE).
	
There is a need to analyze the dissolved gas content of aqueous solutions. Dissolved gases can directly interact with aquatic organisms or can volatilize from solution (the latter described by Henry's law). These processes can result in exposure that, depending on the nature of the dissolved material, can have negative health effects. There is natural occurrence of various dissolved gases in groundwater and can be a measure of health for lakes, streams, and rivers. Dissolved gases also occur as a result of human contamination from fuel and chlorinated spill sites. As such, headspace gas chromatography offers a method for determining if there is natural biodegradation processes occurring in contaminated aquifers. For example, fuel hydrocarbons will break down into methane. Chlorinated solvents such as trichloroethylene, break down into ethene and chloride. Detecting these compounds can determine if biodegradation processes are occurring and possibly at what rate. Natural gas extracted from the earth also contains many low molecular weight hydrocarbon compounds such as methane, ethane, propane, and butane. For example, methane has been found in many water wells in West Virginia.

RSKSOP-175 analysis method
One of the most widely used methods for headspace analysis is described by the United States Environmental Protection Agency (USEPA). Originally developed by the R.S. Kerr USEPA Laboratory in Ada, Oklahoma as a "high quality, defendable, and documented way to measure" methane, ethane, and ethene, RSKSOP-175 is a standard operating procedure (SOP) and an unofficial method employed by the USEPA to detect and quantify dissolved gases in water. This method has been used to quantify dissolved hydrogen, methane, ethylene, ethane, propane, butane, acetylene, nitrogen, nitrous oxide, and oxygen. The method uses headspace gas injected into a gas chromatographic column (GC) to determine the original concentration in a water sample.

A sample of water is collected in the field in a vial without headspace and capped with a Teflon septum or crimp top to minimize the escape of volatile gases. It is beneficial to store the bottles upside down to further minimize loss of analytes. Before analysis begins, the sample is brought to room temperature and temperature is recorded. In the laboratory, a headspace is created by displacing water with high purity helium. The bottle is then shaken upside down for a minimum of five minutes in order to equilibrate the dissolved gases into the headspace. It’s important to note that the bottle must be kept upside down for the remainder of analysis if manually injected. A known volume of headspace gas is then injected onto a gas chromatographic column. An automated process can also be utilized. Individual components (gases) are separated and detected by either a thermal conductivity detector (TCD), a flame ionization detector (FID), or an electron capture detector (ECD). Using the known temperature of the sample, the bottle volume, the concentrations of gas in the headspace (as determined by GC), and Henry's law constant, the concentration of the original water sample is calculated.

Calculations
Using the known temperature of the sample, the bottle volume, the concentrations of gas in the headspace (as determined by GC), and Henry's law constant, the concentration of the original water sample is calculated. Total gas concentration (TC) in the original water sample is calculated by determining the concentration of headspace and converting this to the partial pressure and then solving for the aqueous concentration which partitioned in the gas phase (CAH) and the concentration remaining in the aqueous phase (CA). The total concentration of gas in original sample (TC) is the sum of the concentration partitioned in the gas phase (CAH) and the concentration remaining in the aqueous phase (CA):

Henry's law states that the mole fraction of a dissolved gas (xg) is equal to the partial pressure of the gas (pg) at equilibrium divided by Henry's law constant (H). Gas solubility coefficients are used to calculate Henry's law constant:

After manipulating equations and substituting volumes of each phase, the molar concentration of water (55.5 mol/L) and the molecular weight of the gas analyte (MW), a final equation is solved:

Where Vb is the bottle volume and Vh is the volume of headspace. Cg is the volumetric concentration of gas. For full calculation examples, reference RSK-175SOP.

Practical considerations
One of the major concerns for this method is reproducibility. Due to the nature of calculations, this method is reliant on temperatures to be constant and volumes to be exact. When gases are spiked manually into the GC, the speed and technique in which an analyst does this plays a role in reproducibility. If one analyst is faster in removing gas from the vial and injecting it onto the instrument, then it is important to have the same analyst run on the calibration they prepped, otherwise error will more than likely be introduced. A headspace auto-sampler may remove some of this error, but constant heat and variable temperature on the instrument becomes an issue.

Other methods and techniques
Prior to RSKSOP-175, the EPA used Method 3810 (1986), which before that was Method 5020. However, Method 3810 is still used by some laboratories.

Other headspace GC methods include:

 ASTM D4526-12 and ASTM D8028-17
 EPA 5021A
 Pennsylvania Department of Environmental Protection (PA-DEP) 3686 (#BOL 6019)

Further reading

References

Gas chromatography